The 2022 Mid-American Conference baseball tournament was held from May 25 through 29.  The top four regular season finishers of the league's eleven teams met in the double-elimination tournament to be held at Ball Diamond in Muncie, Indiana, the home field of Ball State who finished 2022 with the highest regular season winning percentage.  Second-seeded Central Michigan won the tournament and earned the conference's automatic bid to the 2022 NCAA Division I baseball tournament.

Seeding and format
The top four teams were seeded according conference winning percentage.  Teams then played a double-elimination tournament.

Results

Schedule

Conference championship

All-Tournament Team 
The following players were named to the All-Tournament Team.

References

Tournament
Mid-American Conference Baseball Tournament